The Hebrew term kareth ("cutting off"), or extirpation, is a form of punishment for sin, mentioned in the Hebrew Bible and later Jewish writings. Kareth in its simplistic meaning refers to an individual being expelled from the Nation of Israel. In the Talmud, kareth means not necessarily physical "cutting off" of life, but can also mean the extinction of the soul and denial of a share in the world to come.

Etymology
The word kareth is derived from the Hebrew verb karat ("to cut off"). The noun form  kareth does not occur in the Hebrew Bible; rather, verb forms such as venichreta ("[that soul] shall be cut off") are most common.

Hebrew Bible
In the Hebrew Bible, verbs that underlie the later use of the noun form kareth refer to forms of punishment including premature death, or else exclusion from the people. According to Richard C. Steiner, the phrase "to be cut off from one's people" is an antonym for "to be gathered to one's people" (e.g. ), and thus to be "cut off" in the Bible means to be deprived of the afterlife.

Examples of sins making a person liable to what is later referred to as kareth include eating chametz on Passover, sexual violations, ritual impurities, and a man's refusal to be circumcised. The Book of Numbers also states that anyone who sins deliberately or high-handedly is "cut off."

Rabbinic interpretation
Kareth is the punishment for certain crimes and offences defined under Jewish law (e.g. eating the life blood of a living animal, eating suet, refusing to be circumcised, etc.), a punishment that can only be given at the hand of heaven unto persons of the Jewish faith who are bound to keep the Jewish law, rather than made punishable by any earthly court. In some cases of sexual misconduct and in breaking the laws of the Sabbath, such as where there are witnesses of the act, the court is able to inflict punishment. By definition, kareth does not apply to non-Jews. Kareth can either mean dying young (before the age of 50 or 60), dying without children, or the soul being spiritually "cut off" from your people after death. According to Nachmanides, both definitions are accurate, and are applicable according to the nature of the person that committed the offense. If he was generally a good person, meaning that the good in him outweighed the evil, he is punished with dying before his time, unless he had other virtues that are cause for him to merit living out his full life, but retains his portion in the world to come. However, if the evil in him outweighed the good, he is then granted a good and lengthy life to reward him for the good that he did in his life, but upon death, he will have no portion in the world to come. According to Rabbi Yonah Gerondi, the Torah itself makes a distinction as to which form of kareth is to be applied for a particular offense. In most cases, the Torah uses the term such as that in Leviticus 18:29; the persons who commit them shall be cut off from among their people, which he says is a reference to a punishment in this world. However, when the Torah uses a term such as that in Numbers 15:31, that person will be cut off completely, his offense will remain with him, that penalty refers to being spiritually cut off after death.

There are two opinions as to what the nature of being spiritually cut off means in reference to the soul after death. Maimonides is of the opinion that this means that upon his death the "soul that left his body is completely destroyed and he dies the death of animal". Nachmanides maintains that the soul is not destroyed, but that the soul being cut off after death is a reference to the spiritual world where after death the soul exists in an exalted spiritual state, and that the penalty of Kareth is that he is not eligible to enter into that world. However, the soul lives on, and is eligible for the resurrection of the dead.

Kareth is applicable only when the transgression was done on purpose, and without later proper repentance, and is applicable only to Jews. When done unintentionally, such a transgression generally requires that a sin-offering be brought.

Kerithoth ("Excisions"), the plural of kareth, is the seventh tractate of the fifth order Kodashim of the Mishnah.

Offenses punishable by kareth
According to the Mishnah, kareth is the punishment for the following 36 offenses (where the offense is sexual intercourse, kareth applies to all consenting parties):
Sexual intercourse with one's mother 
Sexual intercourse with one's father's wife
Sexual intercourse with one's son's wife
A male having sexual intercourse with another male
A male having sexual intercourse with an animal
A female having sexual intercourse with an animal
Having sexual intercourse with both a mother and her daughter within the span of his lifetime
Sexual intercourse with a married woman
Sexual intercourse with one's sister
Sexual intercourse with one's father's sister
Sexual intercourse with one's mother's sister
Sexual intercourse with the sister of one's wife
Sexual intercourse with one's brother's wife
Sexual intercourse with the wife of one's father's brother
Sexual intercourse with a menstruating woman, known as a niddah
Cursing God using the Tetragrammaton, known as megadef (מגדף))
Worshiping a deity other than God, known as Avodah Zarah (In Jewish law, idolatry is understood as implying an act that one does for another god and which is tantamount to what an Israelite would normally do for his own God, such as bowing down unto it, or sacrificing unto it, etc.)
Delivering one's child to Moloch
Consulting with a spirit through a process known as ov (אוב)
Violating the Shabbat by doing one of the 39 categories of activities prohibited on Shabbat
Eating of an offering while in a state of ritual impurity, known as tumah
Entering the temple or Tabernacle while in a state of ritual impurity, known as tumah
Eating of a form of animal fat known as chelev (This prohibition applies only to the suet of domesticated animals, e.g. bullocks, sheep and goats, but not to the suet of wild game animals, such as deer, gazelles, and antelope)
Eating or drinking blood (excluding the blood of fish)
Eating of an offering after the allowable time for the eating of that offering has expired. An offering in this state is known as notar (נותר)
Eating of an offering that was offered with the intention of eating of it after the allowable time for the eating of that offering has expired. Such an offering is known as pigul (פיגול)
Slaughtering an animal offering outside the boundaries of the temple or Tabernacle
Offering up an animal offering upon an altar outside the boundaries of the temple or Tabernacle
Eating chametz on Passover
Eating or drinking on Yom Kippur (applies to eating at least a date's bulk of food within the space of 2–4 minutes) 
Violating Yom Kippur by doing one of the 39 categories of activities that are prohibited on Shabbat
Creating a replication of the holy anointing oil (שמן המשחה) that was used for the anointment of high priests and kings of the house of David that was made by Moses, using the same ingredients and precise measurements, and creating it in the same volume as created by Moses 
Creating a replication of the incense offering, known as the Ketoret, using the same ingredients and precise measurements of the Ketoret
Anointing oneself with the holy anointing oil that was created by Moses
Failure to be circumcised

See also 
 Annihilationism
 Eternal oblivion
 Excommunication
 Herem (censure)
 Mortal sin
Spiritual death

References

 
 Etshalom, Yitzchak "Shabbat and Mikdash" ''Parashat Ki Tissa' 1995-2007' http://www.torah.org/advanced/mikra/5757/sh/dt.57.2.09.html#

External links
 Karet and Modern Theories of Punishment
 Answers
 Karet
 Mikra - PARASHAT KI TISSA

Jewish law and rituals
Hebrew words and phrases in the Hebrew Bible
Hebrew words and phrases in Jewish law